, known as Atsushi or Exile Atsushi (stylized as ATSUSHI and EXILE ATSUSHI) is a Japanese singer-songwriter and part-time producer. Debuting as a member of the band EXILE in 2001, Atsushi is currently one of the main vocalists for the group. In 2004, Atsushi began working as a producer for the group Deep (then known as Color), and in 2011 released his debut solo single "Itsuka Kitto...". In 2016, he announced his temporary hiatus from EXILE and formed a new band named Red Diamond Dogs. Atsushi returned to EXILE in 2018 and later graduated from the group in December 2020 to focus on his solo activities. Atsushi rejoined the Exile Power of Wish tour on a limited basis in 2022 and announced that he would officially return to Exile's activities on the last day of the tour, 21 Dec 2022.

Biography 

Atsushi was born in Saitama on April 30, 1980. He first started playing the piano at four years of age, and at high school after joining a band decided he would rather become a vocalist. After high school, Atsushi attended the ESP Musical Academy in Tokyo to further train himself as a vocalist.

In 2000, Atsushi entered the Asayan televised talent search, making it through to the last five. In 2001, after seeing Atsushi on Asayan, Hiro of the 1990s band Zoo asked him to join a musical group he was producing, called J Soul Brothers. The group had been releasing music since 1999, however when Atsushi and vocalist Shunsuke Kiyokiba were added to the group and the group's original vocalist Sasa decided to leave the group, Hiro renamed the group Exile.

In September 2001, Exile re-debuted with the single "Your Eyes Only (Aimai na Boku no Katachi)". Used as the theme song of the Yutaka Takenouchi and Ryōko Hirosue drama Dekichatta Kekkon, the song was a commercial success, managing to be certified gold by the Recording Industry Association of Japan. In 2002, Exile released their debut album Our Style. The album featured the first song Atsushi wrote lyrics to, "Eyes in Maze", and the first song that featured him as a solo vocalist, .

Through the early 2000s, Exile continued to release hit singles, including "Choo Choo Train" (2003), a cover of the Zoo song of the same name, "Scream" (2005), a collaboration with rock band Glay and "Tada...Aitakute" (2005), a song certified million for ringtone downloads. In 2004, Atsushi began producing the vocal group Deep, and also served as one of the band's members.

In 2008, Atsushi collaborated with R&B singer Ai to release the song "So Special", found on Exile's compilation album Exile Entertainment Best (2008) and her seventh album Viva Ai (2009). In 2009, Atsushi left Deep as a full-time member, renaming the group to Color and serving solely as a producer. In September 2009, Atsushi held his first live as a solo artist, Exh Special Exile Atsushi Live Solo. This was released on DVD in March 2010, and was his first release as a solo artist.

In 2011, Atsushi released his debut single as a soloist, "Itsuka Kitto...". The song was used as the theme song for the drama Hi wa Mata Noboru, and was packaged as a split single with Exile's "Rising Sun". On January 1, 2012, Atsushi released his debut solo album Solo, packaged as a split/double album with Exile's ninth studio album Exile Japan.

In 2016, he formed a new band called Red Diamond Dogs to accompany him for his solo live tour. On July 26, Atsushi sang the Japanese national anthem at a Los Angeles Dodgers baseball game. On August 31, he announced that he will temporarily move his activities outside of Japan and will focus more on improving his craft during 2017 and that he will come back to the country in 2018. Until then, his work as part of EXILE was limited. He returned to EXILE in early 2018, for which they released six new singles and an eleventh studio album Star of Wish.

Many of Exile's most commercially successful songs have been written by Atsushi, including "Everything" (2006), "Someday" (2009), "Yasashii Hikari" (2009), "Motto Tsuyoku" (2010), "Rising Sun" (2011) and "Exile Pride (Konna Sekai o Ai Suru Tame)" (2013).

On November 2, 2020, he announced his graduation from EXILE to focus on his solo career. This decision came about in part due to the COVID-19 pandemic. The fact that he recently turned 40 also made him re-evaluate his life. ATSUSHI is releasing a book, “Sign Break Away from the past. Reincarnate, Stick to One's Beliefs.”, on November 12. In the book, he discusses his thought process in leaving EXILE right before the group's 20th anniversary next year. His last single with EXILE, “SUNSHINE”, will be released on December 16.

Image 

Atsushi is known for wearing sunglasses as a trademark of his image, which he began to do after reacting badly to the bright lights on television sets. He is also known for his buzz cut-style hair style, a style he has kept since 2003.

Discography

Studio albums

Mini-albums

Compilation albums

Singles

As a lead artist

As a featured artist

Promotional singles

Video albums

Works

Books

Notes

References

External links 

Exile website profile
 
 

1980 births
Living people
Japanese male pop singers
Japanese rhythm and blues singers
Japanese male musicians
Japanese male singer-songwriters
Japanese singer-songwriters
Musicians from Saitama Prefecture
People from Koshigaya, Saitama
LDH (company) artists
21st-century Japanese singers
21st-century Japanese male singers